Marvin Lee Hudson (born March 3, 1964) is an American Major League Baseball (MLB) umpire who began his career in the National League in . He has officiated in the 2004 All-Star Game, eight Division Series (2005, 2011, 2012, 2013, 2015, 2016, 2020, 2022), two League Championship Series (2014, 2019), and two World Series (2016, 2020). He wears uniform number 51.

Umpiring career
Prior to reaching the Major Leagues, Hudson served as an umpire in several minor leagues, beginning with the Appalachian League in 1992. From there, he moved on to the South Atlantic League for the following year, during which he also spent time in the Florida Instructional League. After umpiring for the Florida State League in 1994, Hudson moved on to the Southern League in 1995 and 96. He also officiated for the Hawaiian Winter League in 1995. After advancing all the way to the International League, where he umpired from 1997 to 1999, Hudson was promoted to the Major Leagues in 1999.

Hudson was the home plate umpire for Armando Galarraga's near perfect game against the Cleveland Indians on June 2, 2010, and was the second base umpire for Ervin Santana's 2011 no-hitter. Hudson was umpiring at first base in Seattle on April 21, 2012, when Philip Humber threw a perfect game. He was at second base when six Seattle Mariners pitchers combined to no-hit the Los Angeles Dodgers on June 8, 2012.

Hudson has also officiated the World Baseball Classic in 2009 and 2013. MLB assigned him to the Legend Series at Rod Carew Stadium in Panama City, Panama from March 15–16, 2014. Hudson was named a Crew Chief for the 2022 MLB season.

Personal life
He studied Business Administration at Piedmont College, from which he graduated in 1986. Along with fellow umpire Mike DiMuro, Hudson helped start the Blue for Kids Foundation, which is now part of UMPS CARE.

In 2015, Marvin Hudson founded Hudson 51 Official Wear, LLC, an officials equipment supply company based in Norcross, Georgia.

See also

 List of Major League Baseball umpires

References

External links
Major League profile
The Baseball Cube
Retrosheet

1964 births
Living people
Sportspeople from Marietta, Georgia
Major League Baseball umpires
Piedmont University alumni
Piedmont Lions baseball players
Baseball players from Marietta, Georgia